OŠK Trenčianske Stankovce is a Slovak association football club located in Trenčianske Stankovce. It currently plays in Majstrovstvá regiónu Západ west.

Colors and badge 
Its colors are yellow and black.

References

External links 

  

Football clubs in Slovakia
Association football clubs established in 1972
1972 establishments in Czechoslovakia